Boswellia papyrifera, also known as the Sudanese frankincense, is a species of flowering plant and frankincense that is native to Ethiopia, Eritrea and Sudan. The tree is cultivated in Ethiopia because of its valuable resin. The incense is characterized by a fresh lemon-pine scent and is therefore highly esteemed. In Ethiopia where it is called itan zaf, it comes in semi-translucent yellow tears. The gum resin of Boswellia papyrifera coming from Ethiopia, Sudan and eastern Africa is believed to be the main source of frankincense of antiquity.

Chemical constituents
In studies conducted on the chemical properties of the oleo-gum resin of B. papyrifera, it was shown to contain a high concentration of octyl acetate (57.1–65.7%) and N-octanol (3.4–8.8%), the former accounting for its citric note. The species also contain diterpenes and nortriterpenes; the methanol extracts specifically consisting of the following diterpenes: incensole, incensyl acetate and verticilla-4(20),7,11-triene). It also contained the following triterpenes: β-amyrin, α-amyrin, β-amyrenone, and α-amyrenone. The oleogum resin also contained nortriterpenes (24-noroleana-3,12-diene and 24-norursa-3,12-diene) and α-boswellic acid.

References

papyrifera
Plants described in 1843
Flora of Eritrea
Flora of Ethiopia
Flora of Sudan